Aimo and Nadia are a husband-and-wife culinary duo from the Lombardy region of Italy.

Early life 
Aimo Moroni was born in Pescia, Pistoia in the year 1934, and Nadia in Chiesina Azzanese, in the year 1940. While still young, Aimo moved to Milan with his mother, Nunzia, who was a cook. Nadia moved to Milan at age eleven. In 1955, Aimo opened a restaurant near the Centrale.  The two met at this restaurant the following year, and became the culinary duo they are known as today.

Career 
The couple opened Trattoria Aimo e Nadia in 1962 in the Primaticcio neighborhood on via Montecuccoli. They later moved the restaurant to a surburban area.

Aimo and Nadia are known for their modern take on traditional Italian cuisine, incorporating fresh, seasonal ingredients and the concept of "slow food" into their dishes, and are now accredited with being the pioneers of Italian slow food.

In addition to their restaurant, Aimo and Nadia were cookbook authors, publishing several well-regarded books on Italian cuisine. The duo was active in promoting Italian cuisine and culture internationally, participating in culinary events and promoting the use of Italian products and techniques, until their retirement in the early 2000s. After the retirement of Aimo and Nadia, their restaurant Trattoria Aimo e Nadia continued to operate under the leadership of new chefs and the name "Il Luogo di Aimo e Nadia". Il Luogo Aimo e Nadia received two Michelin stars and is known for its accessible cuisine.

Recognition 
According to Identita Golose, they are internationally recognized. One of their more prominent dishes is spaghetto al cipollotto, or spaghetti with spring onion, which according to Corriere della Sera is often ordered instead of dessert. Identita Golose included the dish in their list of 40 masterpieces of the Italian kitchen.

References 

Italian cuisine
Italian chefs
Year of birth missing (living people)
Living people